Villata is a comune in the Province of Vercelli in the Italian region Piedmont, located about  northeast of Turin and about  north of Vercelli.

Villata borders the following municipalities: Borgo Vercelli, Caresanablot, Casalvolone, Oldenico, San Nazzaro Sesia, and Vercelli.

References

External links
 Official website

Cities and towns in Piedmont